Wattbike is a British manufacturer of exercise bikes since 2008.

In September 2020 Wattbike received £11.5 million from Piper, a UK-based investment company, following an increase in sales caused by the COVID-19 pandemic.

In 2021 Wattbike partnered with the All Blacks to supply their indoor bike trainers.

References

External links 
 

British companies established in 2008
Manufacturing companies established in 2008